This is a list of lord mayoralties and lord provostships in the United Kingdom. The dignity of having a lord mayor as civic head is granted to 28 of the 68 districts enjoying city status in England, Wales, and Northern Ireland. In Scotland the similar office of lord provost is reserved for the convener of the four largest of the eight Scottish cities. Four of the lord mayors and two of the lord provosts have the right to the style The Right Honourable.

Before 1863, only York, the City of London, and Dublin had lord mayors, and only Edinburgh and Glasgow had lord provosts. The first four were styled The Right Honourable.

Aberdeen was given a lord provost in 1863. In 1892, Dundee became the last city to be granted a lord provostship, and Belfast was granted a lord mayoralty, as was Cork in 1900. Cork and Dublin ceased to be part of the United Kingdom in 1922, but still have lord mayors. Cardiff was granted the first lord mayoralty in Wales in 1905. Between 1893 and 1935, fifteen cities in England were given a lord mayor: Liverpool, Manchester, Birmingham, Leeds, Sheffield, Bristol, Newcastle, Bradford, Norwich, Hull, Stoke-on-Trent, Nottingham, Leicester, Portsmouth, and Plymouth. 

In the fifties and sixties, lord mayoralties were granted to the English cities of Coventry (1953), Oxford (1962), and Westminster (1966). In 1982, Swansea became the second Welsh city to be given a lord mayor. Three further cities in England were granted lord mayoralties in 1988 (Canterbury), 1992 (Chester), and 2002 (Exeter). In 2012, Armagh became the second city in Northern Ireland with a lord mayor. For Queen Elizabeth II's Platinum Jubilee in 2022, the English city of Southampton was granted a lord mayoralty.

The right to the style The Right Honourable was conferred upon the Lord Provost of Glasgow in 1912, the Lord Mayor of Belfast in 1923, and the Lord Mayor of Cardiff in 1956.

Lord mayoralties (England and Wales)

Lord provostships (Scotland) 

The lord provostships of the cities of Aberdeen, Dundee, Edinburgh and Glasgow were confirmed to the new local authorities formed by the Local Government (Scotland) Act 1973 and Local Government etc. (Scotland) Act 1994.

Lord mayoralties (Northern Ireland)

Use of prefix "The Right Honourable"

The lord mayors of the City of London, York, and Dublin and the Lord Provost of Edinburgh had established the right to the use of the honorific prefix "The Right Honourable" (The Rt Hon.) by the seventeenth century. When new lord mayoralties were created in the 1890s it was not clear if they also enjoyed this privilege. When the grant of a lord mayor was made to Liverpool and Manchester in 1893, Sir Albert William Woods, Garter Principal King of Arms, was of the opinion that

Ten years later his successor as Garter, Sir Alfred Scott-Gatty, decided that this was in error. However, the lord mayors of Liverpool, Manchester and Bristol continued to use the prefix. The matter came to a head in 1921, when King George V visited Liverpool, and the Home Office was forced to write to the council to inform that it could not be used without the express permission of the monarch. In the meantime, the prefix had been formally granted to the Lord Provost of Glasgow in 1912. In 1923 the Lord Mayor of Belfast was granted the honour in recognition of the city's new status as capital of Northern Ireland.

The controversy continued however. Professor John J. Clarke of the University of Liverpool (author of Outlines of Local Government), the Corporation of Manchester and Herbert Woodcock, MP for Liverpool Everton all pressed for the dignity to be applied to all lord mayors. The official position was set out in a parliamentary statement by the Home Secretary, William Joynson-Hicks in July 1927, and repeated in a Home Office document issued in July 1932:

The number of lord mayors or provosts in the United Kingdom entitled to the prefix now stands at six: in 1956 the dignity was allowed to the Lord Mayor of Cardiff, when the city was declared capital of Wales. The Lord Mayor of Bristol continues to use the prefix without official sanction.

Map

On the map below, the first year refers to the granting/confirmation of city status, while the second year refers to the conferral of the lord mayoralty or lord provostship. No years are given for the cities that had a lord mayor or lord provost before 1863. The six cities where the lord mayor or lord provost has the right to the style The Right Honourable are labelled in ALL CAPS: York, the City of London, Edinburgh, Glasgow (since 1912), Belfast (since 1923), and Cardiff (since 1956).

See also
 City status in the United Kingdom
 List of cities in the United Kingdom
 Cities in Ireland
 Towns of the United Kingdom
 Mayors in England

References

External links
Government list

Lists